Chʼol may refer to:
 Chʼol language, a Mayan language of Mexico
 Chʼol people, an ethnic group of Mexico
 Acala Chʼol, an extinct subdivision of the Chʼol people
 Lakandon Chʼol, an extinct subdivision of the Chʼol people
 Manche Chʼol, an extinct subdivision of the Chʼol people

See also
 Chol (disambiguation)